Tico Rico is a 1977 jazz/funk album recorded by saxophonist Hank Crawford and produced by Creed Taylor on the Kudu Records label. The music featured CTI recording artists including Eric Gale, Steve Gadd, Jon Faddis and Randy Brecker. It appeared at number 31 on Billboard Magazine's Best Selling Jazz LPs on October 8, 1977 and peaked at number 28.

Track list
"Tico Rico" (David Matthews) – 4:50
"Teach Me Tonight" (De Paul, Cahn) – 4:18. 
"Lady Soul" (Matthews) – 4:45
"Lullaby Of Love" (Floyd, Williams) – 4:46 
"I've Just Seen A Face" (Lennon, McCartney) – 6:30
"Lament" (Matthews) – 5:06
"Funky Rooster" (Matthews) – 5:54

Personnel
Gary King – bass
Steve Gadd – drums
Jeremy Steig – flute
Eric Gale – guitar
Clifford Carter – keyboards
David Matthews – piano
Sue Evans – percussion
Nicky Marrero – congas
Hank Crawford – alto saxophone
Michael Brecker – tenor saxophone
Jon Faddis – trumpet
Randy Brecker – trumpet

Additional musicians
Alan Shulman, Charles McCracken – cello
Emanuel Vardi, Lamar Alsop – viola
Charles Libove, David Nadien, Emanuel Green, Marvin Morgenstern, Matthew Raimondi, Max Ellen, Max Pollikoff, Paul Gershman – violin
Raymond Simpson, Zachary Sanders – backing vocals
Frank Floyd – backing vocals, solo vocal

Technical personnel
Creed Taylor – producer
David Palmer – mixing engineer
Joe Jorgensen – overdubbing engineer
Don Hahn – recording engineer
Carole Kowalchuk, Sib Chalawick – album art
White Gate – photography

References

External links
Tico Rico at allmusic.com
Tico Rico at discogs.com

1977 albums